Simosyrphus grandicornis is an Australasian species of hoverfly, and is one of the two most common hoverflies in Australia, alongside Melangyna viridiceps. It has been introduced to a number of Polynesian Islands and Hawaii.

References

External links 

 Simosyrphus grandicornis on CSIRO website

Insects of Australia
Diptera used as pest control agents
Syrphinae
Syrphini
Diptera of Australasia
Insects described in 1842
Taxa named by Pierre-Justin-Marie Macquart